Shweta Sekhon (born Shwetajeet Kaur Sekhon, 6 November 1997), is a Malaysian Indian model and beauty pageant titleholder. She was crowned as Miss World Malaysia 2016 and Miss Universe Malaysia 2019. She represented Malaysia at the Miss Universe 2019 pageant in Atlanta, United States.

Background
Shweta was born and raised in Kuala Lumpur, Malaysia of a local Malaysian Indian of ethnic Punjabi descent. She was named after Bollywood actor Amitabh Bachchan's eldest daughter, Shweta Nanda. She was raised by a single mum, a former Malaysia Airlines stewardess, together with her older sister Sabrina. She completed her form six studies at SMK Cochrane, Kuala Lumpur. She is fluent in English, Malay, Punjabi, and Hindi. She also decided to take a break from pursuing her tertiary education to focus on beauty pageants.

Pageantry
Miss Malaysia World 2016

Shweta was scouted online for Miss World Malaysia 2016 pageant and chosen as the official Top 18 of the pageant. At the end of the pageant, she was initially placed as the second runner-up. In September 2016, she was elevated to first runner-up when Ranmeet Jassal gave up her first runner-up title. Six months after the pageant finals, she assumed the Miss Malaysia World 2016 title replacing the winner Tatiana Kumar, who was stripped off title due to "breach of conduct". She was the first in the history of beauty pageants in Malaysia to receive an unprecedented double promotion. Unfortunately, she did not compete in the Miss World 2017 pageant due to conflict in the organization.

Miss Universe Malaysia 2019
Shweta auditioned for the Miss Universe Malaysia 2019 and was chosen as the official Top 18. She was crowned as Miss Universe Malaysia 2019 as well as received subsidiary title, Miss Glojas Beauty by her predecessor, Jane Teoh in the final competition at The Majestic Hotel, Kuala Lumpur on 7 March 2019.

Miss Universe 2019
Shweta represented Malaysia at Miss Universe 2019 pageant which was held on 8 December 2019 in Atlanta, Georgia, United States but was unplaced. An unfortunate incorrect announcement was made during the national costume winner announcement.

Advocacy
Shweta launched a campaign, #YourBodyYourSay as her Miss Universe Malaysia advocacy campaign in August 2019. She hopes to build a much more positive society who is not fearful of accepting their true and real, authentic self. As part of the campaign, she conducted sharing sessions at universities such as HELP University and MAHSA University. The session at MAHSA University was featured in webisode, "Love, Shweta" that was released in October 2019.

Modelling career

2019 – 2020 
In July 2019, Shweta graced the cover for "Bela", "KL Lifestyle", and AEON Malaysia's Pearl magazine. She was also featured in the pages of fashion magazines, "Remaja" and "Majalah Nona". She also walked for Kedah Fashion Week held at Aman Central Mall in Alor Setar. In August, she walked for Kuala Lumpur Fashion Week in Alia Bustaman. 

In February 2020, Shweta graces the cover of FEMALE magazine.

Filmography

Television

Awards and recognition
Special Awards at "Konsert Throwbaek 2019" by Astro – Malaysian Sweetheart

References

External links
 

1997 births
Living people
Miss Universe 2019 contestants
People from Kuala Lumpur
Malaysian people of Indian descent
Malaysian female models
Malaysian beauty pageant winners